Martin Yan (born 22 December 1948) is a Hong Kong chef and food writer. He has hosted his award-winning PBS-TV cooking show Yan Can Cook since 1982.

Early years and education 
With ancestral roots in Hoiping, Yan was born in Guangzhou, Guangdong, China to a restaurateur father and a grocer mother. Yan began to cook at the age of 12. When he was 13, he moved to Hong Kong, where he attended the Munsang College in Kowloon Tsai. During this time in Munsang College, he worked at his uncle's Chinese restaurant and learned the traditional method of Chinese barbecue. He received a diploma from the Overseas Institute of Cookery of Hong Kong and later left for Canada for continued study. Ten years after his arrival in North America, Yan received a Master of Science degree in food science from University of California, Davis, in 1975.

Career
Yan began teaching Chinese cooking for a college extension program and appearing on a Canadian talk show from Calgary in 1978 (on CFAC-TV, now CICT-DT). He has hosted over 3,500 episodes of the PBS cooking show Yan Can Cook since 1982. His shows have been broadcast in over 50 countries. He currently hosts Martin Yan – Quick & Easy. He also hosts Martin Yan's Chinatowns, where he tours Chinatowns around the globe as well as "Martin Yan's Hidden China."

Yan has opened a chain of Yan Can Restaurants and founded the Yan Can International Cooking School in San Francisco. He has written over two dozen cookbooks. The American Culinary Federation has designated him a Master Chef.

Yan is one of the lead actors of the Singapore/Hong Kong film Rice Rhapsody (海南雞飯, 2005).

In 2007, he supported and endorsed the establishment of the World Association of Master Chefs.

He has appeared as a guest judge on several episodes of Iron Chef America and appeared on the cartoon talk show Space Ghost Coast to Coast. He also appeared as a guest judge on the Season 10 finale of Top Chef as well as a Season 11 episode of Hell's Kitchen.

He is not related to Chinese Canadian chef Stephen Yan of the CBC Television series Wok with Yan, though Martin was an employee and had worked for Stephen Yan in the 1980s as demonstrator for Stephen's products.

Television appearances 
 Yan Can Cook (1982— ) – Host
 Christine Cushing Live – Guest
 Space Ghost Coast to Coast (1996) – Guest
 Martin Yan's Hong Kong (2005–2007) – Host
 Martin Yan – Quick & Easy – Host
 Martin Yan's Chinatowns – Host
 Yan Can Cook: Spice Kingdom- Host
 Martin Yan's China (2008) – host
 Iron Chef America (2011) – Judge
 Food Court (2011) Hong Kong Cable TV – Tutor / Host
 Iron Chef Vietnam (2012) – Guest Judge
 Top Chef (2013) – Guest Judge
 Hell's Kitchen (2013) – Guest Judge
 Martin Yan: Taste of Vietnam (2013) – Host
 Back to Basics (2013) – Host
 Martin Yan: Taste of Malaysia (2015) – Host
 Rick Stein's Road to Mexico - Episode 1 (2017) - Guest
 Martin Yan's Asian Favorites (2018— ) - Host

Cookbooks

 Chinese Recipes (1978)
 The Joy of Wokking (1978)
 The Yan Can Cook Book (1981, reprinted 1983)
 Everybody's Wokking
 The Well-Seasoned Wok
 Martin Yan's Feast: The Best of Yan Can Cook
 Chinese Cooking for Dummies
 Martin Yan's Asian Favorites
 Martin Yan's Quick and Easy
 Martin Yan's Chinatowns
 Martin Yan's Chinatown Cooking: 200 Traditional Recipes From 11 Chinatowns Around the World
 Martin Yan's Culinary Journey Through China
 Martin Yan's Asia
 Martin Yan’s China
 Martin Yan's Entertainment At-Home
 Martin Yan the Chinese Chef
 Martin Yan's Invitation to Chinese Cooking
 Martin Yan's Feast
 A Wok for All Seasons, 1988

Restaurants

Awards

 An honorary Doctorate of Culinary Arts by Johnson & Wales University
 A Daytime Emmy Award in 1998 for best cooking show
 A 1996 James Beard Award for Best TV Food Journalism
 A 1994 James Beard Award for Best TV Cooking Show
 The Antonin Careme Award by the Chef's Association of the Pacific Coast
 The Courvoisier Leadership Award by Courvoisier
 2008 Picnic Day (UC Davis) parade marshal
 2022 James Beard Lifetime Achievement Award

See also 
 Chinese American cuisine
 Cantonese cuisine
 Food science

References

External links

 Official Website
 Martin Yan on IMDb
 Martin Yan's PBS home page
 Rice Rhapsody

1948 births
Living people
20th-century American male writers
20th-century Chinese male writers
21st-century American male writers
21st-century Chinese male writers
American food writers
American male chefs
American people of Chinese descent
American people of Hong Kong descent
American writers of Chinese descent
American television chefs
Asian American chefs
Businesspeople from Guangzhou
Chefs from San Francisco
Chinese chefs
Chinese emigrants to the United States
Hong Kong emigrants to the United States
Hong Kong expatriates in the United States
Hong Kong food writers
Hong Kong television personalities
Hong Kong television presenters
People from Taishan, Guangdong
People from the San Francisco Bay Area
University of California, Davis alumni
Writers from Guangzhou